Beach House is a 1977 Italian comedy film directed by Sergio Citti. It was shown as part of a retrospective on Italian comedy at the 67th Venice International Film Festival.

Plot
In a warm August's Sunday, a spacious beach house on Ostia's free beach is used in turn by many characters. A volleyball female team led by a martial coach; a lonely English priest with two penises and two grunty friends searching for girls; two sisters who want to seduce an austere insurance official; two old lovers who want to enjoy their first love meeting; two physically trained soldiers and an elderly couple with a young pregnant granddaughter, Teresina, trying to impute the paternity to a simple minded cousin.

Surrounded by various people, all of which are integral and conscientious part of it, the protagonists try to solve their problems or achieve their goals, thinking to turn reality to their own personal vision of things. Away from everyday life, in that holiday bracket there is time to study and make imaginative moves and countermoves, but they will not be able to change their outcomes. At the end of the day a violent and sudden rain will force everyone to a hurried return to the city.

Cast
 Gigi Proietti as Gigi
 Michele Placido as Vincenzino
 Paolo Stoppa as the grandfather
 Flora Carabella as the grandmother
 Jodie Foster as pregnant granddaughter
 Mariangela Melato as Giulia

 Ugo Tognazzi as Alfredo Cerquetti
 Franco Citti as Nando
 Catherine Deneuve as the woman in the dream
 Ninetto Davoli as the voyeur
 Carlo Croccolo as Carlo
 Anna Melato as Bice
 Kathy Marchand as Ketty
 Massimo Bonetti as the soldier

Production
During an outdoor scene on the bank of a stream near Viterbo, in which some actresses (including Ely Galleani and Ulla Johannsen) were completely naked, a crowd of onlookers had gathered causing a traffic jam, so much so that soon after the police had to intervene which led the actresses to the police station, only to be released shortly after.

References

External links

1977 films
1977 comedy films
Italian comedy films
1970s Italian-language films
Films directed by Sergio Citti
Films set in Rome
Films with screenplays by Vincenzo Cerami
1970s Italian films